The 2023 Nigerian Senate elections in Anambra State will be held on 25 February 2023, to elect the 3 federal Senators from Anambra State, one from each of the state's three senatorial districts. The elections will coincide with the 2023 presidential election, as well as other elections to the Senate and elections to the House of Representatives; with state elections being held two weeks later. Primaries were held between 4 April and 9 June 2022.

Background
The previous Senate elections, only one of the three incumbent senators were returned, with North District Senator Stella Oduah (PDP) being re-elected while Central District's Victor Umeh (APGA) and the South District's Emmanuel Nnamdi Uba (PDP-turned-APC) were defeated in their re-election bids. In the North district, Oduah held her seat for the PDP with 60% of the vote while Uche Ekwunife (PDP) unseated Umeh with 59% of the vote; in the South, Uba was pushed to fourth place in a race won by Ifeanyi Ubah (YPP). These results were a part of a showcase of the state's electoral competitiveness as the House of Representatives seats split between APGA and PDP while APGA retained control of the House of Assembly. On the other hand, the PDP presidential nominee—Atiku Abubakar—won the state easily with about 87%. Two years later, Charles Chukwuma Soludo held the governorship for APGA with 46% of the vote in the gubernatorial election.

During the 2019–2023 term, Ekwunife and Ubah both unsuccessfully ran for governor in 2021 with Ekwunife losing in the PDP primary while Ubah came fourth in the general election; Ubah also was noted as the only YPP senator until July 2022. Oduah was also high-profile due to her ongoing corruption trial, the Pandora Papers revealing that she suspiciously purchased multiple London properties, and multiple defections—she joined the APC in August 2021 (allegedly in exchange for AGF Abubakar Malami stalling her corruption trial) before rejoining the PDP in April 2022 ahead of senatorial primaries.

Overview

Summary

Anambra Central 

The Anambra Central Senatorial District covers the local government areas of Awka North, Awka South, Njikoka, Anaocha, Idemili North, Idemili South, and Dunukofia. The incumbent Uche Ekwunife (PDP), who was elected with 58.5% of the vote in 2019, is seeking re-election.

Primary elections

All Progressives Congress 

On the primary date, Kodilichukwu Okelekwe was the only candidate and thus was nominated by affirmation at the primary in Awka.

All Progressives Grand Alliance 

The primary resulted in victory for Dozie Nwankwo—MHR for Njikoka/Dunukofia/Anaocha and brother-in-law of former Rivers State Governor Rotimi Amaechi. Nwankwo narrowly beat former Senator Victor Umeh by just 11 votes in what was termed "the greatest upset" of the 2022 primaries in the state. In his acceptance speech, Nwankwo thanked party leadership and asked his former opponents to work with him; however, Umeh refused before defecting to the LP to obtain its senatorial nomination.

People's Democratic Party 

On the primary date, Uche Ekwunife was the sole candidate and was nominated unopposed at the primary.

Campaign 
Analysis from prior to the official campaign period categorized the election as a four-way race between Okelekwe, Nwankwo, LP nominee Victor Umeh, and Ekwunife. Pundits noted the multiple political heavyweights and their respective endorsements: Chris Ngige (APC)—Minister of Labour and former Governor, Ben Ndi Obi (PDP)—a former Senator, and Peter Obi (LP)—former Governor and LP presidential nominee in addition to oil mogul Arthur Eze, who is not a member of a party.

As the election neared, reporting from January 2023 noted that the race was also being viewed as both a referendum on the state governorship of Charles Chukwuma Soludo (APGA) and a proxy battle between Obi and Soludo with Obi backing Umeh while observers reported that Soludo was supporting Ekwunife. Campaign analysis showed that Umeh was relying on Obi's popularity in the district and campaigning on being a strong Obi ally if both were to be elected. For Soludo, his purported support for Ekwunife despite their different parties was reportedly based on his wish to stem the rise of the Anambra LP, doubts that APGA's Nwankwo could defeat Umeh, returning a favour to Ekwunife (who reportedly backed Soludo's gubernatorial campaign), and building relationships within the PDP in case he opts to return to the party. However, a Federal High Court ruling on 27 January removed Umeh as the LP nominee based on uncertainty over timing of his party membership. Umeh appealed the ruling early in February and the judgment was overturned on 23 February, two days before the election.

General election

Results

Anambra North 

The Anambra North Senatorial District covers the local government areas of Onitsha North, Onitsha South, Oyi, Ogbaru, Anambra East, Anambra West, and Ayamelum. The incumbent Stella Oduah (PDP), who was elected with 60.2% of the vote in 2019 before defecting to the APC in August 2021 then back to the PDP in April 2022, is seeking re-election.

Primary elections

All Progressives Congress 

Ifeyinwa Anazonwu was submitted to INEC as the APC nominee.

All Progressives Grand Alliance 

The primary, at the Otuocha Stadium in Otuocha, was disrupted by "thugs" who prevented delegates from entering the venue and held some party officials hostage. Although police eventually restored order, the primary was postponed to a later date. On 29 May, the rescheduled primary was held at the Chuba Ikpeazu Township Stadium in Onitsha and resulted in the victory of Ebelechukwu Obiano—the former state First Lady and wife of former Governor Willie Obiano. Obiano beat first runner-up Primus Odili, the former state government Chief of Staff, by a 12% margin.

People's Democratic Party 

Prior to the primary, a controversial screening process initially rejected Oduah's main primary opponent—former MHR Tony Nwoye—disqualifying him from the contest; however, this determination was later overturned and Nwoye was cleared by the new report. Oduah herself was also embroiled in controversy as not only did her sudden return to the PDP anger some party members, reports emerged two days before the primary that she did not complete the mandatory National Youth Service Corps program and had lied about it for years. Despite the controversy, Oduah easily won the primary in Awka as Nwoye had dropped out in protest of the process and would go on to become the LP senatorial nominee. In her acceptance speech, Oduah thanked delegates and vowed to continue serving the district in the Senate. However, Oduah's candidacy was contested in court as internal opponents asked courts to disqualify her based on misleading sworn affidavits on her NYSC service. In her newly submitted documentation to INEC for 2023, Oduah left off previous claims to have attended an American university and completed NYSC after both claims were proven false.

Campaign 
Analysis from prior to the official campaign period categorized the election as a three-way race between Obiano, Oduah, and LP nominee Tony Nwoye; Anaozuonwu was not included due to APC "infighting." Pundits noted Obiano's high profile while First Lady along with her public fight with Bianca Odumegwu-Ojukwu, that Nwoye was expected to be boosted by the Peter Obi presidential campaign, and Oduah's divisive senatorial tenure.

General election

Results

Anambra South 

The Anambra South Senatorial District covers the local government areas of Aguata, Ekwusigo, Ihiala, Nnewi North, Nnewi South, Orumba North, and Orumba South. The incumbent Ifeanyi Ubah (YPP), who was elected with 41.8% of the vote in 2019, is seeking re-election.

Primary elections

All Progressives Congress 

On the primary date, an indirect primary was held at the Ekwulobia Township Stadium in Ekwulobia that ended with Chukwuma Michael Umeoji—House of Representatives member for Aguata—emerging as the nominee.

All Progressives Grand Alliance 

On a new primary date (1 June), four candidates contested an indirect primary at the Dora Akunyili Women Development Centre in Awka that ended with Chris Emeka Azubogu—House of Representatives member for Nnewi North/Nnewi South/Ekwusigo—becoming the nominee after results showed him defeating Emmanuel Nwachukwu by just 3 votes. In his acceptance speech, Azubogu thanked delegates and praised Governor Charles Chukwuma Soludo. However, the lawsuit of third placed Ben Nwankwo was successful when a Federal High Court disqualified Azubogu in late November 2022; the ruling also named Nwankwo as the valid nominee but pending appeal.

People's Democratic Party 

Prior to the primary, a controversial screening process initially rejected a major candidate—former Transcorp CEO and 2021 PDP gubernatorial nominee Valentine Ozigbo—disqualifying him from the contest; however, this report was later overturned and Nwoye was cleared by the new report. Further controversy arose with allegations that the other major candidate, Chris Uba—a longtime political figure and businessman known for purportedly orchestrating the kidnapping of Governor Chris Ngige in 2003—had hijacked ward congresses to impose his own delegates. Despite the controversy, Uba easily won the primary in Awka as Ozigbo had dropped out in protest of the process. In his acceptance speech, Uba thanked delegates and vowed to work hard for the people of the district.

Young Progressives Party 
On 29 May 2022, an indirect primary in Nnewi ended in Ubah's renomination by affirmation as he was unopposed. His acceptance speech called on the party to work with him in the campaign and thanked delegates for the victory.

Campaign
In review of the campaign in December 2022, reporting from The Nation categorized the election as a five-way race between Umeoji, Azubogu (pending litigation over the APGA primary), Uba, and Ubah along with Obinna Uzoh of the ascendant Labour Party. For Ubah, the piece focused on his reported rift with the local Catholic Church leadership due to an allegedly broken promise on a cathedral project; due to the significant political influence of the Catholic Church in the district, pundits doubted Ubah would be able to obtain the level of support from Catholic voters that helped his 2019 campaign. Ubah also faced issues with his local base as Azubogu is also from Nnewi and represents the city in the House of Representatives. Aside from legal issues, Azubogu was accused of being a "serial defector" due to his multiple party switches in two years with analysts claiming that some APGA supporters had not fully accepted him. The Uba campaign also faced difficulties uniting his party along with continued negative perceptions of him due to his role in political violence in the early 2000s. Uzor was labeled a perennial candidate but the presidential candidacy of former Anambra State Governor Peter Obi in the LP provided a boost to Uzor's campaign. Finally, Umeoji faced issues due to the APC's overall unpopularity in the region.

General election

Results

See also 
 2023 Nigerian Senate election
 2023 Nigerian elections

Notes

References 

Anambra State senatorial elections
2023 Anambra State elections
Anambra State Senate elections